Sophora fulvida, the kōwhai or west coast kōwhai is one of 8 species of native Sophora or kōwhai in New Zealand and grows naturally around the Northland, Auckland and Waikato regions of New Zealand.

Under the New Zealand Threat Classification System, it is classified as "At Risk - Naturally Uncommon", because of its restricted range.

See also 
 Kōwhai

References 

fulvida
Trees of New Zealand
Taxa named by Peter James de Lange
Taxa named by Peter Brian Heenan